Suhayya "Sue" Abu-Hakima  is a Canadian technology entrepreneur and inventor of artificial intelligence (AI) applications for wireless communication and computer security. As of 2020, her company Amika Mobile has been known as Alstari Corporation as she exited her emergency and communications business to Genasys in October 2020. Since 2007, she had served as President and CEO of Amika Mobile Corporation; she similarly founded and served as President and CEO of AmikaNow! from 1998 to 2004. A frequent speaker on entrepreneurship, AI, security, messaging and wireless, she has published and presented more than 125 professional papers and holds 30 international patents in the fields of content analysis, messaging, and security. She has been an adjunct professor in the School of Information Technology and Engineering at the University of Ottawa and has mentored many high school, undergraduate, and graduate students in science and technology more commonly known as STEM now. She was named to the Order of Ontario, the province's highest honor, in 2011 for innovation and her work in public safety and computer security technology.

Early life and education
Suhayya Abu-Hakima was born in the Middle East and grew up in Montreal, where her father and mother were both professors at McGill University. She has five siblings.

In 1982 Abu-Hakima graduated from McGill University with a bachelor's degree in engineering, specializing in computers and communications. At Carleton University in Ottawa, she earned her honours master's degree in engineering in 1988 focussed on AI, submitting the thesis, "Rationale: A Tool for Developing Knowledge-based Systems that Explain by Reasoning Explicitly". She earned her honours PhD in artificial intelligence in 1994; her PhD thesis, "Automating Model Acquisition by Fault Knowledge Re-use: Introducing the Diagnostic Remodeler Algorithm", was supervised by Professor Nick Dawes of the Computer and Systems Engineering Department and Professor Franz Oppacher of the School of Computer Science at Carleton University. Her pioneering AI publications are still cited today, decades later.

Career
Abu-Hakima began her career at Bell-Northern Research after receiving her bachelor's degree in 1982. Her accomplishments included the creation of "speech and hand-printed character recognition applications, the Invisible Terminal and AI for telecom". The Invisible Terminal, which she designed in 1983, facilitated wireless communication between mobile, pad-sized terminals and the main network.

In 1987 she joined the National Research Council Canada, where she developed AI applications for "real-world problems" in various fields, including aircraft engine diagnosis and telecommunications network management. She founded and led the Seamless Personal Information Networking laboratory in the NRC's Institute of Information Technology focussed on AI. In 1996 she co-invented a technology for unified messaging networks.

In July 1998 she formed her first startup company, AmikaNow!, which integrated AI applications in its wireless software for mobile phones and computers. In 2004, Entrust acquired AmikaNow! Corporation's content analysis, and compliance technology, and Abu-Hakima served as Vice President of Content Technology for Entrust from 2004 to 2006.

In March 2007 Abu-Hakima co-founded another startup, Amika Mobile, in Ottawa. Using wireless technology created by AmikaNow!, the new company's flagship product, the Amika Mobility Server, auto-generates connections with mobile phones and computers to deliver emergency converged email, SMS, Pop-up, Voice and any emergency alerts and accepts responses. As of 2015, the company has won more than two dozen international awards for its emergency mass notification systems. Amika Mobile has won the US GOVIES awards for 6 consecutive years 2015, 2016 and 2017 2018, 2019 and 2020 before the acquisition by Genasys. Amika Mobile has also won the ASIS 2015 Judge's Choice and Best Security Product.

In October 2020 Abu-Hakima co-founded her third tech start-up after 2 successful exits. Her new start-up is Alstari Corporation which is currently in early stages.

Other activities
Abu-Hakima holds 48 international patents in content analysis, messaging, security and converged emergency alerts. She is a frequent speaker on entrepreneurship, technology, security, emergency communications and AI, and has published and presented more than 125 professional papers.

She has been an adjunct professor in the School of Information Technology and Engineering at the University of Ottawa.

She is active as a community volunteer and mentor. In Ottawa, she is credited with the creation of more than 250 high tech jobs focussed on AI, messaging, content analysis, and security in both tech as well as business. She has served as Vice Chair and Director for the Ontario Centres of Excellence, and as an advisor on the Private Sector Advisory Board for the National Centres of Excellence (2007–2014). She has also served in an advisory capacity on the Big Data Institute Advisory Board at Dalhousie University (2013) and the strategic advisory board at McGill University (2014). In 2003 she was a member of the Prime Minister's Task Force on Women Entrepreneurs. She has mentored many high school, undergraduate and graduate students for education and careers in science and technology.

She is very active in championing women in business as well as STEM professions. She has been called upon in 2011 and again in 2017 by the Government of Canada Operations Committee as a witness on federal procurement policies and how they affect small business as well as women entrepreneurs in STEM.

From 1994 to 1998 she was an editor of Computational Intelligence, the magazine of the Canadian Artificial Intelligence Organization.

Honors and awards

In 2015 and 2016 she was named as a Canada Most Powerful Top 100 in the Trailblazers and Trendsetters Category by the WXN.

WXN Reveals Full List of 2015 Canada's Most Powerful Women: (globenewswire.com) https://www.globenewswire.com/news-release/2015/11/25/1309858/0/en/WXN-Reveals-Full-List-of-2015-Canada-s-Most-Powerful-Women-Top-100-Award-Winners.html 

In 2014 she was named one of the Top 25 Women of Influence by the Women of Influence organization. Four Standout Women in Tech for the 2014 Women of Influence Awards | WhatsYourTech.ca 

In 2012 she was a recipient of the Queen Elizabeth II Diamond Jubilee Medal, being noted as "a technology visionary and tireless volunteer".

In January 2011 she was named to the Order of Ontario.

In 2007 she was named an Outstanding Women Entrepreneur by the Canadian Advanced Technology Association.

Personal
Abu-Hakima is the mother of two children. She resides in Kanata, Ontario.

Selected bibliography

Selected patents
"Alert Broadcasting to Unconfigured Communications Devices" (2013) (with Kenneth E. Grigg)
"Alert broadcasting to a plurality of diverse communications devices" (2012)
"Collaborative Multi-Agent System for Dynamic Management of Electronic Services in a Mobile Global Network Environment" (2011) (with Kenneth E. Grigg)
"Processing of network content and services for mobile or fixed devices" (2011)
"Auto-discovery of diverse communications devices for alert broadcasting" (2010)
"Concept Identification System and Method for Use in Reducing and/or Representing Text Content of an Electronic Document" (2004)
"Apparatus and method for context-based highlighting of an electronic document" (2004)
"Apparatus and method for interpreting and intelligently managing electronic messages" (2002)
"Concept-based message/document viewer for electronic communications and internet searching" (2003)

References

External links
"The Entrepreneur: Heretic or hero of innovation?" (video) TEDx Kenata, March 26, 2015
 "Government Operations Committee on Oct. 20th, 2011" Opening statement by Sue Abu-Hakima
"Government Operations Committee on Dec 7th, 2017" Opening Statement and Meeting Minutes by Suhayya Abu-Hakima.  
"PM Meets With Business, Professional, Academic and Government Stakeholders" (image) November 16, 2010
Selected papers on CiteSeer

Year of birth missing (living people)
Businesspeople from Montreal
Businesspeople from Ottawa
Canadian inventors
Canadian women business executives
Carleton University alumni
McGill University Faculty of Engineering alumni
Members of the Order of Ontario
Living people
Women inventors
National Research Council (Canada)